The 1959 Monte Carlo Rally was the 28th Rallye Automobile de Monte-Carlo. It was won by Paul Coltelloni.

Entry list

Results

References

External links 

Monte Carlo Rally
Monte Carlo Rally
Monte Carlo Rally
Monte Carlo Rally